Leonardo Sierra Sepúlveda (born 10 October 1968) is a Venezuelan former road bicycle racer. He competed in the road race at the 1988 Summer Olympics.

Career achievements

Major results

1988
 1st Stage 4 Vuelta al Táchira
1989
 6th Overall Tour de Luxembourg
1990
 1st Giro del Friuli
 1st Stage 4 Giro di Puglia
 3rd GP Industria & Artigianato
 3rd Overall Giro del Trentino
 7th Giro di Lombardia
 10th Overall Giro d'Italia
1st Stage 17
1991
 1st  Road race, National Road Championships
 1st  Overall Giro del Trentino
1st Stage 3
 1st Stages 4, 7, 9 & 11 Vuelta al Táchira
 2nd Giro di Toscana
 7th Overall Giro d'Italia
1992
 1st  Road race, National Road Championships
 1st Gran Premio Industria e Commercio di Prato
 2nd Giro dell'Appennino
 2nd Giro di Toscana
 6th Overall Giro del Trentino
1993
 1st  Road race, National Road Championships
 1st  Overall Vuelta al Táchira
1st Stages 2, 4, 5 and 7
 1st Prologue GP Cafe de Colombia
 2nd Giro di Toscana
 2nd Giro di Campania
 3rd Trofeo Laigueglia
 3rd Overall Giro del Trentino

Grand Tour general classification results timeline

References

External links

1968 births
Living people
Venezuelan male cyclists
Venezuelan Giro d'Italia stage winners
Olympic cyclists of Venezuela
Cyclists at the 1988 Summer Olympics
People from Mérida (state)
20th-century Venezuelan people
21st-century Venezuelan people